The men's football tournament at the 2004 Summer Olympics was held in Athens and four other cities in Greece from 11 to 28 August. The tournament featured 16 men's national teams from the six continental confederations. The 16 teams were drawn into four groups of four, in which each team would play each of the others once. At the end of the group stage, the top two teams advanced to the knockout stage, beginning with the quarter-finals and culminating with the final at Athens' Olympic Stadium on 28 August 2004.

Qualification
The following 16 teams qualified for the 2004 Olympics football tournament.

Match officials

Africa
 Essam Abd El Fatah (Egypt)
 Divine Evehe (Cameroon)

Asia
 Subkhiddin Mohd Salleh (Malaysia)

North and Central America
 Benito Archundia (Mexico)
 Carlos Batres (Guatemala)

South America
 Horacio Elizondo (Argentina)
 Jorge Larrionda (Uruguay)
 Carlos Torres (Paraguay)

Europe
 Massimo De Santis (Italy)
 Claus Bo Larsen (Denmark)
 Éric Poulat (France)
 Kyros Vassaras (Greece)

Oceania
 Charles Ariiotima (Tahiti)

Seeding

Group stage
Teams highlighted in green went through to the knockout stage.

Group A

Group B

Group C

Group D

Knockout stage

Quarter-finals

Semi-finals

Bronze medal match

Gold medal match

Source for cards:

Final ranking

Statistics

Goalscorers
With eight goals, Carlos Tevez of Argentina is the top scorer in the tournament. In total, 101 goals were scored by 65 different players, with four of them credited as own goals.

8 goals
  Carlos Tevez
5 goals
  José Cardozo
4 goals

  Alberto Gilardino
  Tenema N'Diaye
  Fredy Bareiro

3 goals
  John Aloisi
2 goals

  César Delgado
  Ahmad Elrich
  Stephen Appiah
  Giannis Taralidis
  Emad Mohammed
  Hawar Mulla Mohammed
  Salih Sadir
  Yoshito Ōkubo
  Shinji Ono
  Omar Bravo
  Bouabid Bouden
  Cho Jae-jin
  Lee Chun-soo
  Ali Zitouni

1 goal

  Andrés D'Alessandro
  Gabriel Heinze
  Kily González
  Lucho González
  Mariano González
  Mauro Rosales
  Javier Saviola
  Tim Cahill
  Pablo Brenes
  Álvaro Saborío
  José Villalobos
  Emmanuel Pappoe
  William Tiero
  Dimitrios Papadopoulos
  Ieroklis Stoltidis
  Razzaq Farhan
  Mahdi Karim
  Younis Mahmoud
  Cesare Bovo
  Daniele De Rossi
  Giampiero Pinzi
  Yuki Abe
  Daiki Takamatsu
  Mamadi Berthe
  Rafael Márquez Lugo
  Salaheddine Aqqal
  Carlos Gamarra
  Pablo Giménez
  Aureliano Torres
  Hugo Almeida
  José Bosingwa
  Ricardo Costa
  Jorge Ribeiro
  Cristiano Ronaldo
  Miloš Krasić
  Srđan Radonjić
  Simon Vukčević
  Kim Dong-jin
  Kim Jung-woo
  José Clayton
  Mohamed Jedidi

Own goals

  Loukas Vyntra (playing against South Korea)
  Adama Tamboura (playing against South Korea)
  Haidar Jabar (playing against Portugal)
  Fernando Meira (playing against Costa Rica)

References

External links
 Olympic Football Tournaments Athens 2004 – Men, FIFA.com
 RSSSF Summary
 FIFA Technical Report

Men's tournament
Men's events at the 2004 Summer Olympics